Fox News @ Night is an American current affairs program on Fox News hosted by Trace Gallagher. Episodes air live Tuesday through Saturday from midnight to 1 a.m. ET. It is the channel's last live program on the weekday schedule. The program reports on the day's events and features interviews and political analysis.

The show has been a part of the Fox News weekday lineup since October 30, 2017.

Guest hosts for Gallagher include Kevin Corke, Jonathan Hunt, Gillian Turner,  and Mike Emanuel.

Anchor 
Trace Gallagher (2022—present): Gallagher, who has been with Fox since its inception, serves as Fox News' Chief Breaking News correspondent. He was named permanent host of the program in September of 2022 following the departure of founding host Shannon Bream when she was named anchor of Fox News Sunday.

Broadcast history 
The show premiered on October 30, 2017, at 11 p.m. (a time slot which traditionally carried repeats of the 8 p.m. shows The O'Reilly Factor and Tucker Carlson Tonight), extending live programming lineup for Fox News.

In April 2021, the Fox News late-night talk show Gutfeld! debuted in the 11 p.m. slot, and Fox News @ Night moved to midnight ET. However, in the event of breaking news, Fox News @ Night will air for an additional early hour, preempting Gutfeld!.

On September 21, 2022, Trace Gallagher was named host of the program following the departure of Shannon Bream. Due to Gallagher living in California the show now broadcasts from Fox News' Los Angeles bureau. The show had been broadcast from Fox News' Washington D.C. bureau since its inception.

Former Hosts
Shannon Bream (2017—2022): Founding host of the show, departed the program on August 30, 2022 after she was named permanent host of Fox News Sunday. Replaced by Trace Gallagher.

References

External links 
  on Fox News
 

2010s American television talk shows
2020s American television talk shows
2010s American television news shows
2020s American television news shows
2017 American television series debuts
Current affairs shows
English-language television shows
Fox News original programming